Air Marshal Sir Richard John Knighton,  (born 1969) is a senior Royal Air Force officer and engineer. Since May 2022, he has served as Deputy Commander Capability at Air Command. Previously, he served as Assistant Chief of the Air Staff (2015 to 2017) and Deputy Chief of Defence Staff (Financial and Military Capability) (2018 to 2022) at the Ministry of Defence.

Early life
Knighton was educated at Hatton Secondary School. As a University Cadet sponsored by the Royal Air force, he studied engineering at Clare College, Cambridge. He graduated in 1991 with a first class Bachelor of Arts (BA) degree; as per tradition, his BA was later promoted to a Master of Arts (MA Cantab) degree.

Military career
Knighton joined the Royal Air Force (RAF) in 1988. In his early career, he served as an engineer officer and worked on Nimrod and Tornado F3 aircraft. He saw active service in the Kosovo War. In 2006, he was appointed military assistant to the Deputy Chief of the Defence Staff (Equipment Capability). He then served as Deputy Assistant Chief of Staff Strategy and Plans at Air Command in 2007. From 2009 to 2011, he served as Station Commander of RAF Wittering.

In May 2011, Knighton was appointed Director of Air Plans at the Ministry of Defence. From January 2015 to 2017, he served as the Assistant Chief of the Air Staff. As such, he was a member of the Air Force Board and also sat on the board of the Civil Aviation Authority as a non-executive member. In July 2016 it was announced that he would become Assistant Chief of the Defence Staff (Capability & Force Design) with effect from January 2017. In December 2018, he was promoted to Air Marshal and appointed as Deputy Chief of Defence Staff (Financial and Military Capability) at the Ministry of Defence. In May 2022, he was appointed Deputy Commander Capability at Air Command.

Knighton was appointed Companion of the Order of the Bath in the 2017 New Year Honours and Knight Commander of the Order of the Bath (KCB) in the 2022 Birthday Honours.

References

|-

|-

1969 births
Alumni of Clare College, Cambridge
British aerospace engineers
Knights Commander of the Order of the Bath
Living people
Royal Air Force air marshals